Senator Hopson may refer to:

Briggs Hopson (born 1965), Mississippi State Senate
Eben Hopson (1922–1980), Alaska State Senate